Autonomy is the capacity of a rational individual to make an informed, un-coerced decision; or, in politics, self-government.

Autonomy may also refer to:

 Autonomy (Eastern Orthodoxy), the status of a hierarchical church
 The Autonomy, a 2009 political coalition in Italy
 HP Autonomy, previously Autonomy Corporation, a defunct enterprise software company owned by Hewlett-Packard
 Autonomy (novel), a 2009 Doctor Who novel by Daniel Blythe
 Autonomy, a 1919 play by Philip Barry

Music
 Autonomy (album), by Kekal, 2012
 Autonomy (Drenge EP), 2018
 Autonomy, an EP by Zedd, 2011
 "Autonomy", a song by the Buzzcocks from Another Music in a Different Kitchen, 1978

See also
 Autonomous, a 2017 novel by Annalee Newitz
 Autonomous area, an area of a country that has a degree of autonomy
 Autonomous category, in mathematics, a special kind of category in which every object has a dual
 Vehicular automation, involves various types of intelligent technological systems to assist a vehicle's operator
 Autonomous robot, a cybernetic machine that can operate separately from human control
 Autonomous car, self-steering passenger vehicle
 Autonomous aircraft, a type of unmanned aerial vehicle
 Autonomous social centers, community centers in which non-authoritarians enact principles of mutual aid
 Learner autonomy, awareness of one's potentials and strategies to take advantage of one's learning context
 Responsible autonomy, a component of triarchy in organizational theory
 Autonomic (disambiguation)
 Autonomous system (disambiguation)
 Autonomí, the name of emergency autoland technology developed by Garmin for their G3000 avionics system